Alliance Air (formerly Air India Regional) is a wholly-owned subsidiary of AIAHL (AI Assets Holding Ltd.) which is a Special Purpose Vehicle (SPV ) formed by Government of India after the disinvestment of Air India Limited. It was founded in April 1996 as a wholly-owned subsidiary of Indian Airlines (later merged with Air India in 2011 and remained a subsidiary till 2022) and mainly operates domestic routes as part of the government's Regional Connectivity Scheme.

History
Alliance Air was founded in April 1996 as a wholly-owned subsidiary of Indian Airlines (merged with Air India in 2011). The parent company wished to make better use of its Boeing 737 fleet, so it wet-leased 12 of these aircraft to Alliance Air. The subsidiary operated its first flight on 15 April 1996. Alliance Air served as a low-cost feeder airline for Indian Airlines, providing connections to the latter's hubs from various smaller cities across the country. In 2002 the airline was offering flights to 44 destinations in India utilizing a fleet of 11 Boeing 737-200s. On 1 April 1997, Vayudoot Airlines, a joint venture of Air India and Indian Airlines Merged with Alliance Air to serve the regional air routes of Northeast India and several other parts of India.

Alliance Air began operating its first scheduled international flight from Chennai to Jaffna on 11 November 2019. Alliance Air announced that it had recorded an operating profit for the first time in its history during the 2019-20 fiscal year. The airline stated that it had adopted the new  IND AS 116 accounting standard, and would have actually recorded a net profit of  under the previous standard.

Alliance Air's parent company, Air India Limited, was sold to Tata Sons on 8 October 2021. Alliance Air was not a part of the deal, and was instead transferred to Air India Asset Holdings Ltd (AIAHL), a state-owned special purpose vehicle that holds Air India's remaining assets and liabilities. The Economic Times reported that the government also intended to sell Alliance Air and use the proceeds to pay down AIAHL's debt.

Alliance Air signed an agreement with Hindustan Aeronautics Limited (HAL) to lease two 17-seater Dornier 228 aircraft in September 2021. The first aircraft was delivered to Alliance Air on 7 April 2022. The Dornier 228 had previously only been used by the Indian Armed Forces but was modified by HAL for commercial operations. Alliance Air deployed the aircraft on a new route connecting Dibrugarh, Assam and Pasighat, Arunachal Pradesh on 12 April 2022, becoming the first airline to use an Indian-made aircraft in civil aviation operations and the first commercial airline in the country to operate the Dornier 228 aircraft.

Since 15 April 2022, Alliance Air came under the control of Government of India, after Tata Sons announcing it not to be a subsidiary of Air India anymore, as the group acquired the ownership of the Air India in January 2022. Subsequently, Alliance Air started functioning independently and selling its tickets under Alliance Air banner.

Destinations

Alliance Air operates to 75 destinations in India as of November 2022. It operates regional services in India through its hubs in Bengaluru, Delhi, Hyderabad, Kolkata and Mumbai. The airline started its first international flight from Chennai to Jaffna on 11 November 2019 but temporarily had to halt operations from Chennai due to the COVID-19 pandemic.

Fleet
Alliance Air operates the following aircraft :

Former fleet

See also
Air India
Air India Express
Air India Cargo
Air India Air Transport Services
Indian Airlines

References

External links
 

Air India
Companies based in Mumbai
Airlines established in 1996
Airlines of India
Indian companies established in 1996
1996 establishments in Delhi